The Ballads ~Love & B'z~ is the fifth compilation album by the Japanese rock duo B'z. Like its predecessors, it reached 1st at Oricon, with more than 1.7 million copies sold.

Track listing 

Alone
Konya Tsuki no mieru Oka ni (今夜月の見える丘に)
Home
Calling
Time
Kienai niji (消えない虹)
Gekko (月光)
Hapinasu (Happiness) (ハピネス)
Mou ichido Kiss shitakatta (もう一度キスしたかった)
Naite naite nakiyandara (泣いて泣いて泣きやんだら)
One
Everlasting
Gold
Snow

Certifications

References

External links 
 

B'z compilation albums
Being Inc. compilation albums
2002 compilation albums